Michael G. Vaughn is a professor of social work at the School of Social Work in the Saint Louis University School of Social Work where he is also the current (and founding) director of the Ph.D. in social work program.

His research spans multiple disciplines, including criminology, epidemiology, and social work. In 2014, he co-authored a                        study which found that immigrants are less likely to engage in antisocial behaviors than native-born Americans.

Career
Vaughn has taught at Saint Louis University since 2008. In 2017, he was elected as a fellow of the American Academy of Social Work and Social Welfare.

References

External links
Faculty page

Living people
Saint Louis University faculty
American social workers
Truman State University alumni
University of Missouri–St. Louis alumni
Regis University alumni
Washington University in St. Louis alumni
American criminologists
Social work scholars
Year of birth missing (living people)